Floral City is a census-designated place (CDP) in Citrus County, Florida, United States. The population was 5,216 at the 2010 census. The community is home to the Floral City Heritage Hall Museum and hosts the Floral City Heritage Days the first weekend in December. The area has a history of phosphate mining and includes historic homes.

Geography
Floral City is located in southeastern Citrus County at 28°44′N 82°18′W (28.7407,-82.2954). It is bordered to the south by Hernando County. U.S. Route 41 runs through the community, leading north  to Inverness, the Citrus County seat, and south  to Brooksville.

Floral City is located at the south end of Tsala Apopka Lake, a chain of lakes and wetlands that are part of the Withlacoochee River basin. The town is located at the 23 mile marker (middle) of the Withlacoochee State Trail, a linear state park that follows an old railroad line.

History

Floral City was laid out and surveyed in 1883 by the surveyor W.H. Havron and then-Senator Austin S. Mann. The land was owned by James Baker, son-in-law of ex-Confederate soldier John Paul Formy-Duval, an early area settler and landowner. The village was at one time larger than Miami, due to the phosphate mining industry located in Citrus County. Around the time of World War I, the mining industry shut down in Floral City. After the war, mining was moved south to the Bartow area east of Tampa.

The community is said to be a slice of "Old Florida" that remains relatively intact.  The town was named Floral City for its abundance of wild flowers, which are still plentiful today.

Demographics

As of the census of 2000, there were 4,989 people, 2,180 households, and 1,473 families residing in the CDP. The racial makeup of the CDP was 96% White, 1.6% African American, 0.36% Native American, 0.14% Asian, 0.04% Pacific Islander, 0.38% from other races, and 1.14% from two or more races. Hispanic or Latino of any race were 2.6% of the population.

There were 2,180 households, out of which 20.4% had children under the age of 18 living with them, 56.7% were married couples living together, 7.1% had a female householder with no husband present, and 32.4% were non-families. 27.8% of all households were made up of individuals, and 16.7% had someone living alone who was 65 years of age or older.  The average household size was 2.25 and the average family size was 2.69.

In the CDP, the population was spread out, with 20.3% under the age of 18, 4.5% from 18 to 24, 20.5% from 25 to 44, 25.4% from 45 to 64, and 29.2% who were 65 years of age or older.  The median age was 49 years. For every 100 females, there were 92.3 males.  For every 100 females age 18 and over, there were 91.6 males.

The median income for a household in the CDP was $28,180, and the median income for a family was $33,404. Males had a median income of $26,972 versus $22,348 for females. The per capita income for the CDP was $14,793.  About 10.7% of families and 15.1% of the population were below the poverty line, including 22.6% of those under age 18 and 7.5% of those age 65 or over.

Education
The CDP is served by Citrus County Schools. Zoned schools include Floral City Elementary School, Inverness Middle School, and Citrus High School.

The Floral City Library of Citrus Libraries is in Floral City.

References

External links
 Floral City at City-data.com

Census-designated places in Citrus County, Florida
Census-designated places in Florida
Former municipalities in Florida